During the 1992–93 French football season, Olympique de Marseille competed in French Division 1.

Season summary
Marseille won French Division 1, and also became the first (and, to date, only) French club to win the European Cup defeating A.C. Milan 1–0. However, it was later revealed that midfielder Jean-Jacques Eydelie had (on behalf of the Marseille board) bribed Valenciennes players Jorge Burruchaga, Christophe Robert and Jacques Glassman to lose the last match of the season, which Marseille needed to win the secure the French title, so that Marseille could win the match without much exertion ahead of the Champions League final. The scandal saw Marseille stripped of their title, relegated to Division 2 and banned from defending the Champions League or competing in the European Super and Intercontinental Cups, although they were allowed to remain European champions.

First-team squad
Squad at end of season

Competitions

Division 1

League table

Results summary

Results by round

Coupe de France

European Cup

First round

Second round

UEFA Champions League

Final

Top scorers

Ligue 1
 Alen Bokšić 23
 Rudi Völler 18
 Franck Sauzée 12

Coupe de France
 Jean-Marc Ferreri 2
 Rudi Völler 2

Champions League
 Franck Sauzée 6
 Alen Bokšić 6
 Abedi Pele 3

Notes and references

Notes

References

Olympique de Marseille seasons
Olympique de Marseille
UEFA Champions League-winning seasons